The 1997 Robert Morris Colonials football team represented Robert Morris College, now Robert Morris University, as a member of the Northeast Conference (NEC) during the 1997 NCAA Division I-AA football season. The Colonials were led by 4th-year head coach Joe Walton and played their home games at Moon Stadium on the campus of Moon Area High School. The Colonials finished the 1997 season with their second consecutive NEC championship and their second consecutive ECAC Bowl title.

Schedule

References

Robert Morris
Robert Morris Colonials football seasons
Northeast Conference football champion seasons
ECAC Bowl champion seasons
Robert Morris Colonials football